Buba is both a given name and a surname. Notable people with the name include:

Buba Badjie (born 1967), Gambian-Swedish veterinarian
Buba Baldeh (1953–2014), Gambian politician, journalist and newspaper editor
Buba Galadima, Nigerian politician
Buba Yohanna (born 1982), Cameroonian footballer
Minusu Buba (born 1985), Nigerian footballer
Pasquale Buba (1946–2018), American film editor
Tony Buba (born 1943), American filmmaker

See also
Buba Corelli, stage name of Amar Hodžić (born 1989), Bosnian rapper
Buba, 2022 spin-off film of the German TV series How to Sell Drugs Online (Fast), for the character of that name